Atagema intecta is a species of sea slug or dorid nudibranch, a marine gastropod mollusk in the family Discodorididae.

Distribution 
This species was described from Sri Lanka. It is found in the tropical Indo-West Pacific Ocean.

Ecology
This dorid nudibranch feeds on sponges.

References

Discodorididae
Molluscs of the Indian Ocean
Molluscs of the Pacific Ocean
Gastropods described in 1859
Taxa named by Edward Frederick Kelaart